Alexander Delgado (born January 11, 1971) is a former Venezuelan catcher in Major League Baseball who played with the Boston Red Sox in their 1996 season. Listed at 6' 0", 160 lb., Delgado batted and threw right-handed. He was born in Palmarejo, Zulia.

In a 26-game career, Delgado posted a batting average of .250 (5-for-20) with one RBI and five runs without home runs. 
 
Delgado also spent 18 seasons in the Minor Leagues, mostly in the Red Sox system, and had stints in the Mexican League with the Rieleros de Aguascalientes and Olmecas de Tabasco.  

In between, Delgado played winter ball with four clubs of the Venezuelan League during 23 seasons spanning 1988–2011. 

His teammates dubbed him El Señor de los Anillos (The Lord of the Rings), as he was a member of 11 champion teams while collecting the most Championship Series rings of any player in Venezuelan professional baseball history. Additionally, he caught for the Tigres de Aragua club that clinched the 2009 Caribbean Series title.

A dependable and durable catcher for 23 years, Delgado played more than 2,000 games in his career before retiring in 2011 at the age of 40.

See also
 List of Major League Baseball players from Venezuela

See also
Boston Red Sox all-time roster
 List of players from Venezuela in Major League Baseball

Sources
Baseball Almanac
Baseball Reference
Encyclopedia of Baseball Catchers
Retrosheet
Tigres de Aragua website
Venezuelan Professional Baseball League
Gutiérrez, Daniel; Alvarez, Efraim; Gutiérrez (h), Daniel (2006). La Enciclopedia del Béisbol en Venezuela. LVBP, Caracas. 

1971 births
Living people
Águilas del Zulia players
Arizona League Red Sox/Mariners players
Boston Red Sox players
Camden Riversharks players
Cardenales de Lara players
Caribes de Oriente players
Charlotte Knights players
Dunedin Blue Jays players
Fort Lauderdale Red Sox players
Gulf Coast Red Sox players
Huntsville Stars players
Indianapolis Indians players
Lynchburg Red Sox players
Major League Baseball catchers
Major League Baseball players from Venezuela
Memphis Redbirds players
Mexican League baseball catchers
New Britain Red Sox players
Olmecas de Tabasco players
Pawtucket Red Sox players
People from Zulia
Rieleros de Aguascalientes players
Syracuse SkyChiefs players
Tigres de Aragua players
Trenton Thunder players
Venezuelan expatriate baseball players in Mexico
Venezuelan expatriate baseball players in the United States
Winter Haven Red Sox players